Metarfa is a town and commune in Aougrout District, Adrar Province, in south-central Algeria. According to the 2008 census it has a population of 8,438, up from 7,061 in 1998, with an annual growth rate of 1.8%.

Geography

The villages in Metarfa commune are built near various scattered oases in the southern part of the  Gourara region of northern Adrar Province, about halfway between Timimoun and Adrar. The surrounding areas generally consist of rocky plains interspersed with low sand dunes.

Climate

Metarfa has a hot desert climate (Köppen climate classification BWh), with extremely hot summers and mild winters, and very little precipitation throughout the year.

Transportation

Roads lead out of Metarfa town to the southwest and northeast. The road to the southeast connects to the N6 highway, while the road to the northeast branches; the branch to the northwest leads to the villages of Ouled Rached and Ouled Ali while the branch to the southeast leads to Ouled Mahmoud and Oufrane, and eventually to Aougrout.

Education

2.8% of the population has a tertiary education, and another 10.5% has completed secondary education. The overall literacy rate is 73.8%, and is 85.8% among males and 61.2% among females.

Localities
As of 1984, the commune was composed of 11 localities:

Ouled Mahmoud
Saala
Metarfa
Ouled Rached
Ouled Ali
Oufrane

References 

Neighbouring towns and cities

Communes of Adrar Province
Cities in Algeria